The Taiwan Association for Human Rights (TAHR) is a Taiwan based non-governmental organization which was established on International Human Rights Day, December 10, 1984. TAHR is the oldest independent human rights organization in Taiwan.

External links
 

1984 establishments in Taiwan
Human rights organizations based in Taiwan
Organizations established in 1984